CelsiusPro AG is a Swiss company specialized in structuring and originating tailored weather index products worldwide. Using a proprietary platform, CelsiusPro enables online price calculation, execution and position reporting as well as weather statistics and analysis. It is predominantly active in the primary weather market offering corporate hedges to companies from weather dependent industries such as: energy, construction, agriculture, tourism and leisure, events and transportation. In addition, CelsiusPro structures and implements micro weather index schemes in developing countries. It is the winner of the 2009 Swiss Insurance Industry award for Innovation.

CelsiusPro has a strategic partnership with Swiss Re for risk management and risk transfer since inception. Aon Benfield is CelsiusPro’s strategic partner for weather sensitivity analyses and reinsurance solutions for weather dependent insurance portfolios. CelsiusPro partners with a number of financial institutions to provide their clients with weather risk solutions, pricing and execution services under a fully branded white label partnership solution and offers introducing broker partnerships. Among others, it is the main partner for weather risk management solutions for the Dutch construction association Bouwend Nederland. CelsiusPro has also supported a research paper of the University of Sankt Gallen (CH) on weather risks in the energy sector.

Weather Index Products 
The weather index products such as  OTC weather derivative or weather insurance contracts, are based on climatic indices for underlyings such as temperature, rain, snow, wind and radiation for weather stations across Europe, Australia, Canada and the US. The price calculations and settlements are based on measurements of official national weather stations or satellite data.

References

Further reading
 What every CFO needs to know about weather risk management, written by Jarvis Cromwell, Storm Exchange Inc., sponsored by CME Group
 Artemis: Disclosure of weather and climate related risks
 Weather Risk Management Association (WRMA)
 NOAA Climate Services, National Oceanic and Atmospheric Administration

Companies based in Zürich
Financial services companies established in 2008
Swiss companies established in 2008
Risk management companies